Shorter than the Day is a 2020 art installation by Sarah Sze which overhangs LaGuardia Airport Terminal B's baggage claim. The spherical structure is built from a network of suspended rods and 900 photographs of the New York sky shot from dawn to dusk. She was partly inspired by the Grand Central Terminal clock. At the time of her work's unveiling, she called it her most complex sculpture.

Description 

The installation artist Sarah Sze designed Shorter than the Day as a spherical constellation of suspended rods. Around its edges are 900 photographs of the New York sky shot from dawn to dusk. As the Earth revolves around the sun, by walking the perimeter of the work, the viewer sees the sky shift from day to night.

The sculpture hangs in LaGuardia Airport Terminal B, where it starts on the departures level atrium and passes through an opening in the floor into the baggage claim level. It is titled in reference to Emily Dickenson's poem, "Because I could not stop for Death".

Production 

LaGuardia Gateway Partners and the Public Art Fund commissioned Shorter than the Day. Sze wanted the installation to be "almost like a mirage", ethereal and fragile, while capturing the "feeling of shifting time and place" that goes with air travel. She was also inspired by the definitional Grand Central Terminal clock. 

The sculpture was fabricated by Amuneal, based in Philadelphia. Sze, a New York-based artist, was in the city during the COVID-19 pandemic lockdown and so continued her work on the sculpture with her team during that time. The printed photographs are connected to the aluminum and steel rods with alligator clips. The work weighs five tons.

At the time of the sculpture's unveiling, on June 11, 2020, Sze considered the work her most complex yet. The work was unveiled along that of three other artists in the terminal.

References

Further reading

External links 

 

2020 sculptures
Installation art works
LaGuardia Airport